The Medusa Seed (1994) is an original novel written by Dave Stone and based on the long-running British science fiction comic strip Judge Dredd. It is Stone's second Judge Dredd novel, and again features the character Detective-Judge Armitage, who appeared in Stone's first such novel, Deathmasques.

Synopsis
Armitage and his assistant Judge Steel come to Mega-City One to pursue a murderer, under the watchful eye of Judge Dredd. When their quarry escapes through time back to the 1930s, Dredd and Steel must follow him there. Meanwhile, Armitage is lost in the Undercity.

Continuity
The Medusa Seed includes the only explanation in any Judge Dredd story of the origins of people with psionic abilities, such as members of Justice Department's Psi Division (since "psis" existed before the Atomic Wars and are therefore not mutations created by the ensuing radiation). Psis are said to be the product of illegal medical experiments on children during the 20th century by the US National Security Agency.

References

External links
The Medusa Seed at the 2000 AD website.

Novels by Dave Stone
Judge Dredd novels
1994 British novels
Novels set in the 22nd century
Virgin Books books